Vladimir Kožul (born 2 June 1975) is a Serbian former footballer.

Kožul played as defender with FC Radnicki, Serbia, ND Mura 05 and NK Nafta Lendava in the Slovenian PrvaLiga, FC Macabi Netanya,Israel, Dunaújváros FC, Hungary

2012-2019 was the head coach of the young team FC CUKARICKI, Serbia. From 2019 - coach at U21 AZERBAIJAN NATIONAL TEAM
Kožul: Dobro će nam doći provera sa Mančester Sitijem] at sportnetwotk.rs, 21-6-2014, retrieved 9-4-2015 </ref>

Honours
2. SNL
Runner-up: 2004-05

References

1975 births
Living people
Serbian footballers
FK Radnički Beograd players
ND Mura 05 players
Maccabi Netanya F.C. players
NK Nafta Lendava players
Dunaújváros FC players
Israeli Premier League players
Serbian expatriate sportspeople in Israel
Expatriate footballers in Slovenia
Expatriate footballers in Israel
Expatriate footballers in Hungary
Association football defenders
Serbian football managers
Serbian expatriate sportspeople in Slovenia
Serbian expatriate sportspeople in Hungary